Table tennis was contested at the 2017 Summer Universiade from August 22 to 29 at the New Taipei City Xinzhuang Gymnasium 1F in New Taipei City, Taiwan. Men's and women's singles, men's and women's team, and men's, women's, and mixed doubles events were contested.

Medal summary

Medal table

Events

References

External links 
2017 Summer Universiade – Table tennis
Result book – Table tennis

 
2017
Summer Universiade
2017 Summer Universiade events